Sportklub Sturm Graz is an Austrian association football club, based in Graz, Styria, playing in the Austrian Football Bundesliga. The club was founded in 1909. Its colours are black and white.

In its history, Sturm Graz has won the Austrian football championship three times, in 1998, 1999 and 2011, and participated several times in the UEFA Champions League and UEFA Europa League. Their biggest rivals are Graz neighbours Grazer AK.

History

Foundation 
SK Sturm Graz was founded in 1909 as a workers team, as opposed to its neighbours Grazer AK, founded in 1902. Between 1921 and 1949, the team enjoyed considerable success in winning the regional Styrian championship 11 times.

The Anschluss in 1938 made Austria part of the German Third Reich and Austrian clubs became part of German football competition. Sturm played in the opening round of the 1940 Tschammerpokal, predecessor to the modern-day DFB-Pokal. They then qualified to play in the Gauliga Ostmark, one of Germany's top-flight regional leagues, in 1941. The team withdrew part way through the 1941–42 season and was relegated after an 11th-place result in the following campaign.

In 1949, Sturm entered the Austrian national league as the first non-Vienna-based team.

1981: First success 
The first great success came under manager Otto Barić, when the club finished runners-up in the league in the 1980–81 season. In 1983–84, the club battled through to the quarter-finals of the UEFA Cup, beaten only by Nottingham Forest through a penalty in extra-time.

1992: Start of a new era 
In December 1992, Hannes Kartnig was installed as president, naming his close friend Heinz Schilcher as new manager. At the time, Sturm was languishing under enormous debts. Sturm qualified for the newly formed Zehnerliga, and Kartnig and Schilcher decided the best course of action would be to abstain from big-name signings, opting instead for a new start using young players from the club's youth setup. In 1993, Milan Đuričić became manager.

1994 to 2002: Osim and European football 
In 1994, the Bosnian Ivica Osim took control of the up-to-now unsuccessful Sturm; this proved to be a crucial turning-point in the club's history. Osim succeeded in producing an effective and powerful team using the young and inexperienced players at his disposal, strengthened with a few experienced leading players. The team's first success was as runners-up in the league in 1995. One year later, they won their first title, beating Admira Wacker in the cup final, but wobbling in the league to finish runners-up yet again.

In 1998, Sturm won its first Austrian Bundesliga title, pulling away from the field early on and winning the title with seven games in hand. Sturm set two records during this season; they remained unbeaten in their first 12 matches, and then for another 19 matches later in the season. At the end of the season, they amassed 81 points, an Austrian record total, winning the title with 19 points ahead of Rapid Wien. This season also saw the development of the "magic triangle" of Mario Haas, Hannes Reinmayr and Ivica Vastić.

The year 1999 saw Sturm Graz retain the title, securing the treble as they did so (league, cup and super cup), in addition to appearing in the qualification for the UEFA Champions League. Here, however, a scoreless draw with Spartak Moscow proved to be the team's only success. The 1999–2000 season saw Sturm in the Champions League for a second time, finishing third in its group. FC Tirol wrested the domestic title from Sturm's grasp, but the runners-up spot achieved was sufficient for a third trip into the following season's Champions League.

Sensationally, Sturm Graz won its Champions League Group D (against Galatasaray, Rangers and Monaco), reaching the second round for the first time. The league campaign was less successful – a fourth-place finish, the worst under Osim.

After the Champions League exploits, several key players out of the 12 who later left were not suitably replaced. Worse still, this hasty squad redevelopment devoured almost all the profit made from the European campaign. Only a small fraction of the money was invested in youth development to establish an academy.  Despite this, the newly assembled team again finished in second place in the league, but failed at the qualification hurdle for the Champions League. This, together with increasing criticism from the club president, precipitated the departure of Osim after eight years at the helm.

2002 to 2009: Consolidation 

Franco Foda and Gilbert Gress (seven defeats in nine games) both enjoyed short and fruitless stints as coach, before former sweeper Michael Petrović took control in autumn 2003. He presided over a gradual introduction of young talent, securing the team's place in the top flight in both 2004 and 2005, finishing in seventh position.

Since 2005, Sturm has been facing financial problems and, on 1 September 2006, a petition of bankruptcy was filed by the tax authorities. Because of the financial situation, Sturm was forced to use young players who were soon sold to reconsole the club. Also in 2006, coach Michael Petrović left the club and was replaced by Franco Foda.

2009 to present day: New successes 

After a fourth-place finish in 2009, the Blackies qualified for the group stage of the UEFA Europe League in 2009–10. Their opponents were Galatasaray, Panathinaikos and Dinamo București. In 2010, the Blackies won the ÖFB-Cup in Klagenfurt in front of 25,000 of its own fans against Wiener Neustadt. That was the highest number of fans ever travelling to a match in a different state.

In 2010–11, Sturm won the Austrian championship. A highlight of the season was a qualifying match against Juventus in the UEFA Europa League.

In 2011–12, Sturm played in the UEFA Champions League qualification rounds and managed to defeat Hungarian club Videoton and Zestafoni of Georgia. In the play-off, however, Sturm Graz lost against BATE Borisov, thus ensuring qualification to the group stages of the Europa League, where they were grouped with Anderlecht, Lokomotiv Moscow and AEK Athens. At the end of the season, Sturm finished fifth in the Bundesliga and head coach Franco Foda was fired after six years. With his replacement Peter Hyballa, Sturm played strong during the autumn months, but a poor spring resulted in Hyballa's dismissal before the end of the season. Luckily, Sturm managed to fourth in the final league table, albeit with the lowest number of points ever sufficed for fourth place. This ensured Europa League qualification for the subsequent year. Darko Milanič, who won several titles with Maribor in Slovenia, took the reins of the club for the 2013–14 campaign.

Stadium 

The traditional home of the team for many years was the Gruabn, which held over 12,000 people – almost exclusively standing – and which was characterised by its narrow playing field and the proximity of the fans to the players. From 1997 to 2005, Gruabn was used just as a training ground and for youth and amateur matches. In 2005, the ground was sold to the city of Graz to relieve the club's financial difficulties. The year 1997 saw the club's move to the Arnold Schwarzenegger Stadium, shared between Sturm and its local rivals, Grazer AK. From February 2006, the stadium was called UPC-Arena. In July 2016, Merkur Insurance won the Sponsoring rights for the stadium. The stadium is now called the Merkur Arena.

Fans and the Graz Derby 
A study published in 2008 by the German market research institute Sport + Markt showed that Sturm have around 360,000 fans across Austria, which is only second to the number of Rapid Wien supporters. In Europe, there are estimated to be 410,000 fans, which ranks them as the 117th-most supported club.

There are several organised fan groups – the biggest and most well-known are Jewels Sturm and the Brigata Graz, which were both founded in 1994, and Grazer Sturmflut, founded two years later in 1996.

Sturm fans have a very strong friendship with fans of German 2. Bundesliga club Karlsruhe. They have also contacts with fans of Werder Bremen and fans from Pisa and Carrara in the Italian league. More recently, they have also had contacts with a group of Maribor ultras.

Sturm have a big rivalry with cross-town rivals Grazer AK, with whom they compete the Graz Derby. In 1974, there was big opposition from both sets of fans against a proposed merger to become "FC Graz." Since 1920, excluding the friendly matches (especially before the first official Styrian Cup in 1920), 197 matches have been played between the two, of which there were 185 encounters in the league (130 at the professional level and 55 at amateur level in the Styrian League); an additional five encounters in the Austrian Cup; one match in the Austrian Supercup; two meetings in the Tschammerpokal and four games in the Styrian Cup. The very first Derby took place in 1911, the last was dated 17 May 2007. So far, Sturm have won more derby matches than Grazer AK.

Other rivalries are with the two Vienna clubs (Austria Wien and Rapid Wien) due to the history of competition for trophies between the three clubs, and as with most ultras the fans have a strong dislike of Red Bull Salzburg, unhappy with the acquisition of Austria Salzburg by Austrian energy drink company Red Bull.

Honours 
 Austrian Bundesliga
 Champions (3): 1997–98, 1998–99, 2010–11
 Runners-up (7): 1980–81, 1994–95, 1995–96, 1999–2000, 2001–02, 2017–18, 2021–22

 ÖFB-Cup
 Winners (5): 1995–96, 1996–97, 1998–99, 2009–10, 2017–18
 Runners-up (4): 1947–48, 1974–75, 1997–98, 2001–02

 Austrian Supercup
 Winners (3): 1996, 1998, 1999
 Runners-up (2): 1997, 2002

 Austrian Amateur Champions (1): 1934
UEFA Champions League (3 participations): 1998–99, 1999–2000, 2000–01 (2nd Group stage)
UEFA Cup (11 participations): 1970–71, 1974–75, 1978–79, 1981–82, 1983–84 (Quarter-final), 1988–89, 1991–92, 1995–96, 1999–2000, 2002–03
UEFA Intertoto Cup (1): 2008 (Joint Winner)

European records 
Q= Qualifying
P= Preliminary
PO = Play-off

Players

Current squad

Out on loan

Retired numbers

Coaching staff

Managerial history 

  Leopold Kruschitz (1945–46)
  Josef Molzer (1946–49)
  Ludwig Durek (1950)
  Franz Czernicky (1951–52)
  Karl Decker (1952–54)
  Janos Gerdov (1954)
  Hans Gmeindl (1955)
  Rudolf Strittich (1 July 1955 – 30 June 1956)
  Josef Blum (1956–58)
  Ludwig Durek (1958–60)
  János Szép (1960–61)
  Otto Mühlbauer (1961)
  August Rumpf (1961–62)
  Lajos Lörinczy (1962–63)
  August Rumpf (1963)
  Rudolf Suchanek (1963–64)
  Karl Adamek (1965–66)
  Franz Fuchs (1966–67)
  Karl Kowanz (1967)
  Gerd Springer (1967–70)
  János Szép (1970–71)
  August Rumpf (1971)
  Adolf Remy (1971–72)
  Karl Schlechta (1972–77)
  Dr. Günther Paulitsch (1977–80)
  Otto Barić (1 July 1980 – 30 June 1982)
  Gernot Fraydl (1 July 1982 – 9 April 1984)
  Robert Pflug (10 April 1984 – 23 September 1984)
  Hermann Stessl (24 September 1984 – 30 June 1985)
  Ivan Marković (1 July 1985 – 12 October 1985)
  Franz Mikscha (13 Oct 1985 – 30 June 1986)
  Walter Ludescher (1 July 1986 – 24 September 1988)
  Manfred Steiner (int.) (24 September 1988 – 31 October 1988)
  Otto Barić (1 Oct 1988 – 30 June 1989)
  August Starek (1 July 1989 – 1 November 1991)
  Robert Pflug (1 Nov 1991 – 1 October 1992)
  Ladislav Jurkemik (1 Nov 1992 – 30 June 1993)
  Milan Đuričić (1 July 1993 – 30 June 1994)
  Ivica Osim (1 June 1994 – 14 September 2002)
  Franco Foda (14 September 2002 – 31 May 2003)
  Gilbert Gress (1 July 2003 – 31 August 2003)
  Mihailo Petrović (1 September 2003 – 31 May 2006)
  Franco Foda (1 July 2006 – 12 April 2012)
  Thomas Kristl (int.) (12 April 2012 – 31 May 2012)
  Peter Hyballa (1 June 2012 – 22 April 2013)
  Markus Schopp (int.) (22 April 2013 – 3 June 2013)
  Darko Milanič (4 June 2013 – 23 September 2014)
  Günther Neukirchner (int.) (23 September 2014 – 30 September 2014)
  Franco Foda (30 September 2014 – 1 January 2018)
  Heiko Vogel (1 January 2018 – 5 November 2018)
  Günther Neukirchner (int.) (5 Nov 2018 – 12 November 2018)
  Roman Mählich (12 Nov 2018 – 31 June 2019)
  Nestor El Maestro (1 July 2019 - 25 June 2020)

Club management

Administration 
 President: Christian Jauk

Coaching staff 
 Coach: Christian Ilzer
 Asst. Coach: Dominik Deutschl, Uwe Hölzl
 Goalkeeping Coach: Stefan Loch
 Youth and Amateur Team Coach: Mohamed Sahli

References

External links 

 Official Website
Sturm Graz at UEFA.COM
Sturm Graz at EUFO.DE
Sturm Graz at Weltfussball.de
Sturm Graz at Football Squads.co.uk
Sturm Graz at National Football Teams.com
Sturm Graz at Football-Lineups.com
 Onlinenews about Sturm Graz

 
Association football clubs established in 1909
Football clubs in Austria
Football clubs from former German territories
1909 establishments in Austria